Vajnory is a small borough in the northeast of Bratislava, Slovakia. 

Milan Rastislav Štefánik international airport is located near Vajnory. Another airport - Vajnory Airport, which was the first airport in Slovakia - closed in 2006.

History
The first written mention of Vajnory dates to 1237, when it was a village with the original Slovak Slovak name Prača / Pračany. In 1307, Heiligenkreuz Abbey in Austria purchased it and renamed it Weinern, referring to the main occupation of the villagers, working on vineyards and making wine. A relic of this name remains today in the Slovak variant, Vajnory. It was purchased again by Bratislava in the 16th century. It was a borough only until 1851, when, shortly after the abolition of serfdom, Vajnory became an independent village again. It was made an official borough of Bratislava in 1946.

Photogallery

References

External links
Official website
Unofficial description

Boroughs of Bratislava